"Devil Side" is the fifth single by Vamps, released on May 12, 2010. It includes a cover of the 1982 song "Live Wire" by Mötley Crüe. The limited edition came with a DVD that includes two versions of the music video for the title track.

Chart performance
The single reached number 2 on the Oricon chart.

Track listing

References 

2010 singles
English-language Japanese songs
Japanese rock songs
Songs written by Hyde (musician)
2010 songs